Samuel Laird Cregar (July 28, 1913December 9, 1944) was an American stage and film actor. Cregar was best known for his villainous performances in films such as I Wake Up Screaming (1941) and The Lodger (1944).

Cregar's screen career began in 1940 working as an extra in films. By 1941, he had signed a film contract with 20th Century Fox. Cregar quickly rose to stardom, appearing in a variety of genres from screwball comedy to horror movies. He was a popular actor at the time of his death in 1944 at age 31, a result of complications from binge dieting undertaken to suit him for leading man roles.

Early life
Laird Cregar was born in Philadelphia, the youngest of six sons of Elizabeth (née Smith) and Edward Matthews Cregar. His father was a cricketer and member of a team called the Gentlemen of Philadelphia, which toured internationally in the late 1890s and early 1900s. By his own account Laird was sent to England at the age of eight to be educated at Winchester College, where he developed his abilities with British accents. He also appeared on stage for the first time when he was eight. He performed as a page boy with the Stratford-upon-Avon theatrical troupe, and continued to act in several other productions at Stratford. "From that time on", he said later, "all I've ever wanted to do is go on stage." However, Gregory William Mank in his biography of Laird found no evidence in the Winchester College archives that he attended the school, or any passenger records to show that Laird even went to England. In fact the visit to England story does not work in terms of dates. Laird's father died 6 May 1916, when Laird was three years old.

Cregar graduated from the Episcopal Academy in Philadelphia when he was 14. He wanted to act but he was too young to go to college, so he convinced the Hedgerow Players, an amateur company in Germantown, Pennsylvania, that he was an actor, and he spent several years with them. He also acted with other stock companies in Philadelphia and wrote some plays that were performed by amateur groups.

In 1936, Cregar won a scholarship to California's Pasadena Playhouse. He spent two years there, acting and studying; he said Thomas Browne Henry of the Playhouse gave him the worst advice he possibly could, telling him "not to lose a pound of weight, but instead to develop a thin man's personality."

He returned to Pennsylvania to appear in Federal Theatre projects. He went back to the Pasadena Playhouse for several months, then made his professional debut with the West Coast production of The Great American Family. When that ended he was unable to find a job for six months, and was forced to sleep in a friend's car in their garden.

Career

Cregar read a copy of the play Oscar Wilde by Leslie and Sewell Stokes, which had been a great triumph for English actor Robert Morley. Cregar felt the lead role would be ideal for him, and he pitched the project to a number of producers. His proposal was eventually picked up by Arthur Hutchinson, who mounted the play in Los Angeles in April 1940 with Cregar. The production was a triumph for Cregar, the Los Angeles Times saying he "scored a sensational success." John Barrymore saw him and said he was one of the most gifted young stage actors in the past 10 years.

Cregar's performance immediately attracted the interest of Hollywood studios: Cregar was tested for the second lead in The Letter (1940) and made screen tests for MGM and Paramount. The producer and director of Oscar Wilde were reported as preparing an independent company to star Cregar in William Muir's The Life of Mohammed. He was tested by 20th Century Fox, which considered him as a replacement for Tyrone Power in a film titled The Great Commandment (1939).

Cregar performed Oscar Wilde in San Francisco, then eventually signed with 20th Century Fox. They announced him for The Californian, which was not made, but Cregar was then cast in the big-budget historical movie Hudson's Bay (1941), opposite Paul Muni. He followed this up supporting Tyrone Power in Blood and Sand (also 1941), although he came down with measles during production, forcing filming to shut down for a week. Cregar made a major impression in both films—the latter in particular was a big success.

He was then cast as Francis Chesney in Charley's Aunt (1941). After his portrayal of the obsessed detective in I Wake Up Screaming (1941), he was borrowed for RKO to make Joan of Paris (1942). Cregar briefly returned to the stage to appear in the title role of The Man Who Came to Dinner; it was at the El Capitan, the site of his triumph in Oscar Wilde, and was well received. Paramount borrowed him for This Gun for Hire (1942), a film noir. Cregar played the film's antagonist, Willard Gates, opposite Veronica Lake and Alan Ladd.

He followed that with the successful screwball comedy Rings on Her Fingers (1942) playing a con artist opposite Gene Tierney, then back to villainy with Ten Gentlemen from West Point (1942).

Seldom weighing less than 300 lbs. (136 kg) throughout his adult life, Cregar became obsessed with his weight. Nonetheless John Chapman of the Chicago Daily Tribune predicted he would become one of the "stars of 1942".

In 1943, David Bacon, a young actor with whom Cregar had been having an affair, was knifed to death, according to accounts in the press, which also published pictures of Cregar, calling him "such a good friend" of the victim. This prompted studio executive Darryl F. Zanuck to arrange for an article in Silver Screen to link Cregar romantically with Dorothy McGuire and to report that, despite his weight, the actor was considered sexy by many women.

Stardom

In March 1943, Fox announced plans to cast Cregar in the starring role in The Lodger (1944), as a character who may or may not be Jack the Ripper. Cregar began crash diets to lose weight, desiring to give the character a "romantic veneer".

The film was a big hit, but the increasingly sensitive Cregar was growing tired of being thought of as merely a hulking villain. He was announced to play Inspector Javert in a production of Les Misérables, but this was postponed, and Fox wanted him to play demented pianist George Bone in Hangover Square (1945). Cregar refused the role, was put on suspension, then changed his mind. Fame  soon brought radio roles on Lux Radio Theater in 1943 and a guest spot on The Eddie Cantor Show in April 1944.

Death
The crash diet that Cregar followed for his roles in The Lodger and Hangover Square (which included prescribed amphetamines) placed a strain on his system, resulting in severe abdominal problems. He underwent surgery at the beginning of December 1944. According to TCM host Eddie Muller's January 2023 post-film comments on Hangover Square, the procedure was bariatric surgery, intended to control his weight. 

It was intended that Cregar's next film would be an adaptation of Les Misérables directed by John Brahm, and Billy Rose wanted to star him on Broadway in Henry VIII. A few days after surgery, Cregar had a heart attack and was rushed to the hospital. He rallied briefly when put in an oxygen tent, but died on December 9, aged 31 years. His mother was at his bedside. Hangover Square was released two months after his death.

The funeral was held on December 13, 1944. Vincent Price, Cregar's co-star in Hudson's Bay (1941), delivered the eulogy. Cregar is interred in Forest Lawn Memorial Park in Glendale, California. His estate was valued at $10,000 ($ today).

On February 8, 1960, Cregar received a star on the Hollywood Walk of Fame at 1716 Vine Street for his contributions to the film industry.

Filmography

Select theatre credits
Brother Rat – Pasadena Community Playhouse – March 1939
To Quito and Back by Ben Hecht – Pasadena Community Playhouse – April 1939 – co-starring with Victor Mature
The Wingless Victory by Maxwell Anderson – Pasadena Community Playhouse – July 1939
The Great American Family – Pasadena Playhouse – August 1939
Oscar Wilde by Leslie and Sewell Stokes – El Capitan Theatre, Los Angeles – April 22 – May 19, 1940 – toured San Francisco in June
The Man Who Came to Dinner – El Capitan Theatre, Los Angeles – September 1941 – revived in Samford in 1944
Cregar also reportedly wrote a number of plays.

References

Further reading

External links

 
 
 

1913 births
1944 deaths
20th-century American male actors
20th Century Studios contract players
American male film actors
American male stage actors
American expatriates in England
Burials at Forest Lawn Memorial Park (Glendale)
Episcopal Academy alumni
American gay actors
Male actors from Philadelphia
People educated at Winchester College
People from Stratford-upon-Avon
Federal Theatre Project people